Jered Guzman (born September 12, 1981 in Garden Grove, California) is an American retired competitive pair skater.  From 1992 to 1998, he teamed with Natalie Vlandis, capturing the gold medal at the 1996 U.S. Junior Championships and finishing fifth at the 1998 U.S. Figure Skating Championships.  He then joined forces with Amanda Magarian for several years, with a fourth-place finish for the pair at the 2000 Nationals. After that partnership ended, he briefly skated with Jennifer Don.

Guzman's mother, Jennie Walsh, won the bronze medal in ladies' singles at the 1967 U.S. Figure Skating Championships, and was Guzman and Vlandis' coach.

Results

Men's Singles

Pairs
(with Vlandis)

(with Magarian)

(with Don)

References
 Junior Achievement: a look at the 1996 u.s. junior champions
 Pairs on Ice competitive history: Vlandis & Guzman
 Pairs on Ice competitive history: Magarian & Guzman
 Pairs on Ice competitive history: Don & Guzman

1981 births
American male pair skaters
Living people
People from Garden Grove, California